Mirza Muhammad Hadi Ruswa (1857 – 21 October 1931) was an Indian Urdu poet and writer of fiction, plays, and treatises (mainly on religion, philosophy, and astronomy). He served on the Nawab of Awadh's advisory board on language matters for many years. He spoke many languages including Urdu, Greek, and English.

His famed Urdu novel, Umrao Jan Ada, published in 1905, is considered by many as the first Urdu novel. It is based on the life of a renowned Lucknow courtesan and poet of the same name.

Life
In 1857, Ruswa was born at Lucknow, India. After completing his education at Thomson Engineering School, Ruswa spent the majority of his career in education. Apart from his teaching positions, Ruswa worked as a civil servant and as a railroad worker. On October 21, 1931, Ruswa died in Osmania.

Writing career
In 1887, Ruswa began his literary career with a poetry adaption of Laila-Majnu. During the early 1900s, Ruswa released Afshai Raz and Umrao Jan Ada. Following Zat-e-Shareef and Shareef Zada, Ruswa also released Akhtari Begum. Apart from poems, Ruswa wrote penny dreadfuls and religious works about Shia.

Bibliography
 Umrao Jaan Ada, 2003, Publisher: Sang-e-Meel. .

Further reading
 The Courtesan of Lucknow (Umrao Jan Ada), (UNESCO Collection of Representative Works). Hind Pocket Books, 1970.
 Hasan Shah. The Nautch Girl: A Novel. Translated by Qurratulain Hyder. New Delhi: Sterling Publishers, 1992.
 Umrao Jan Ada. Translated by David Matthews. New Delhi, Rupa and Co., 2006. .
 Umrad Jan Ada, Translated K. Singh (English). Orient Paperbacks, 2005. . 
 Umrao Jan Ada, Translated Khushwant Singh (English). 2006. Disha Books. .

References

External links
 Urdu text of Mirza Hadi Ruswa's Umrao Jaan Ada, 1899

Urdu-language poets
Indian Muslims
Urdu-language novelists
1857 births
1931 deaths
Indian dramatists and playwrights
Writers from Lucknow
Urdu-language fiction writers